The 2012–13 season was Northampton Town's 116th season of existence and their fourth competitive season in League Two. Along with competing in League Two, the club also participated in the FA Cup, League Cup and Football League Trophy. The season covered the period from 1 July 2012 to 30 June 2013.

Players

Pre-season

Competitions

League Two

League table

Results summary

League position by match

Matches

Play-offs

FA Cup

Capital One Cup

Johnstone's Paint Trophy

Appearances, goals and cards

Transfers

Transfers in

Transfers out

Loans in

Loans out

References

Northampton Town F.C. seasons
Northampton Town